Chuck Klausing (April 19, 1925 – February 15, 2018) was an American football player and coach. He served as the head football coach at Indiana University of Pennsylvania from 1964 to 1969 and at Carnegie Mellon University from 1976 to 1985, compiling a career college football record of 124–25–2. Klausing's 1968 IUP Indians team played in the Boardwalk Bowl, losing to Delaware. He was inducted into the College Football Hall of Fame as a coach in 1998. He retired as the 19th winningest coach in NCAA football history.

Coaching career
Klausing was the head football coach at Pitcairn High School from 1948 to 1953 and Braddock High School from 1954 through 1959, where his teams won an unprecedented six consecutive Western Pennsylvania Interscholastic Athletic League (WPIAL) championships. His six teams at Braddock went 54–0–1 during that period. They broke the national undefeated record set by Massillon Washington High School.

Klausing was head coach at Carnegie Mellon University from 1976 to 1985, winning six conference championships and making the NCAA Division III playoffs four times. He won the National Coach of the Year award by ABC-TV in 1979 and TBS in 1983.

Head coaching record

College

References

External links
 

1925 births
2018 deaths
Army Black Knights football coaches
Carnegie Mellon Tartans football coaches
IUP Crimson Hawks football coaches
Penn State Nittany Lions football players
Pittsburgh Panthers football coaches
Rutgers Scarlet Knights football coaches
Slippery Rock football players
West Virginia Mountaineers football coaches
High school football coaches in Pennsylvania
College Football Hall of Fame inductees
United States Marine Corps officers
United States Marine Corps personnel of World War II
Military personnel from Pennsylvania
People from Wilmerding, Pennsylvania
Coaches of American football from Pennsylvania
Players of American football from Pennsylvania